The University of Bologna (UNIBO) is a public research university in Bologna, Italy. Founded in 1088 by an organised guild of students (studiorum), it is the oldest university in continuous operation in the world, and the first degree-awarding institution of higher learning. At its foundation, the word universitas was first coined. With over 90,000 students, it is the second largest university in Italy after La Sapienza in Rome.

It was the first place of study to use the term universitas for the corporations of students and masters, which came to define the institution (especially its law school) located in Bologna.
The university's emblem carries the motto, Alma Mater Studiorum ("Nourishing mother of studies"),  the date A.D. 1088.
It has campuses in Cesena, Forlì, Ravenna and Rimini and a branch center abroad in Buenos Aires, Argentina. It also has a school of excellence named Collegio Superiore di Bologna. An associate publisher of the University of Bologna is the Bononia University Press. The university saw the first woman to earn a university degree and teach at a university, Bettisia Gozzadini, and the first woman to earn both a doctorate in science and a salaried position as a university professor, Laura Bassi.

It is one of the most prestigious universities in Italy and is commonly ranked among the top universities in Italy and the world. It is especially renowned for its studies in law, medicine, and the natural sciences. University of Bologna had a central role in the sciences during the Italian renaissance, where it housed and educated Nicholas Copernicus as well as numerous other renaissance mathematicians.

History 

The date of the University of Bologna's founding is uncertain, but believed by most accounts to have been 1088. The university was granted a charter (Authentica habita) by Holy Roman Emperor Frederick I Barbarossa in 1158, but in the 19th century, a committee of historians led by Giosuè Carducci traced the founding of the university back to 1088, which would make it the oldest continuously operating university in the world. However, the development of the institution at Bologna into a university was a gradual process. Paul Grendler writes that “it is not likely that enough instruction and organization existed to merit the term university before the 1150s, and it might not have happened before the 1180s.”

The university arose around mutual aid societies (known as universitates scholarium) of foreign students called "nations" (as they were grouped by nationality) for protection against city laws which imposed collective punishment on foreigners for the crimes and debts of their countrymen. These students then hired scholars from the city's pre-existing lay and ecclesiastical schools to teach them subjects such as liberal arts, notarial law, theology, and ars dictaminis (scrivenery). The lectures were given in informal schools called scholae. In time the various universitates scholarium decided to form a larger association, or Studium—thus, the university. The Studium grew to have a strong position of collective bargaining with the city, since by then it derived significant revenue through visiting foreign students, who would depart if they were not well treated. The foreign students in Bologna received greater rights, and collective punishment was ended. There was also collective bargaining with the scholars who served as professors at the university. By the initiation or threat of a student strike, the students could enforce their demands as to the content of courses and the pay professors would receive. University professors were hired, fired, and had their pay determined by an elected council of two representatives from every student "nation" which governed the institution, with the most important decisions requiring a majority vote from all the students to ratify. The professors could also be fined if they failed to finish classes on time, or complete course material by the end of the semester. A student committee, the "Denouncers of Professors", kept tabs on them and reported any misbehavior. Professors themselves were not powerless, however, forming collegia doctorum (professors’ committees) in each faculty, and securing the rights to set examination fees and degree requirements. Eventually, the city ended this arrangement, paying professors from tax revenues and making it a chartered public university.

The university is historically notable for its teaching of canon and civil law; indeed, it was set up in large part with the aim of studying the Digest, a central text in Roman law, which had been rediscovered in Italy in 1070, and the university was central in the development of medieval Roman law. Until modern times, the only degree granted at that university was the doctorate.

Bettisia Gozzadini earned a law degree in 1237, being one of the first women in history to obtain a university degree. She taught law from her own home for two years, and in 1239 she taught at the university, becoming the first woman in history to teach at a university.

In 1477, when Pope Sixtus IV issued a papal bull, authorizing the creation of Uppsala University in Sweden, the bull specified that the new university would have the same freedoms and privileges as the University of Bologna - a highly desirable situation for the Swedish scholars. This included the right of Uppsala to establish the four traditional faculties of theology, law (Canon Law and Roman law), medicine, and philosophy, and to award the bachelor's, master's, licentiate, and doctoral degrees.

Laura Bassi was born into a prosperous family of Bologna and was privately educated from the age of five. Bassi's education and intellect was noticed by Prospero Lorenzini Lambertini, who became the Archbishop of Bologna in 1731 (later Pope Benedict XIV). Lambertini became the official patron of Bassi. He arranged for a public debate between Bassi and four professors from the University of Bologna on 17 April 1732. In 1732, Bassi, aged twenty, publicly defended her forty-nine theses on Philosophica Studia at the Sala degli Anziani of the Palazzo Pubblico. The University of Bologna awarded her a doctorate degree on 12 May. She became the first woman to receive a doctorate in science, and the second woman in the world to earn a philosophy doctorate after Elena Cornaro Piscopia in 1678, fifty-four years prior. She was by then popularly known as Bolognese Minerva. On 29 October 1732, the Senate and the University of Bologna granted Bassi's candidature, and in December she was appointed professor of natural philosophy to teach physics. She became the first salaried woman lecturer in the world, thus beginning her academic career. She was also the first woman member of any scientific establishment, when she was elected to the Academy of Sciences of the Institute of Bologna in 1732. Bassi became the most important populariser of Newtonian mechanics in Italy.

In 1971, the Graecist Benedetto Marzullo in company with Umberto Eco, Renato Barilli, Adelio Ferrero. instituted within the Faculty of Letters and Arts the DAMS (acronym of discipline delle arti, della musica e dello spettacolo, "Dicipline of Arts, Musics and Performance"). It was the first degree course of this type to be opened in Italy. Between December 26, 1982, and November 29, 1983, there occurred the DAMS murders (in Italian: Delitti del DAMS), dealing with four victims who were students or professors of the DAMS: Angelo Fabbri (a brilliant student of Umberto Eco), Liviana Rossi, the dancer Francesca Alinovi (who was stabbed for 47 times), and Leonarda Polvani.

Organization

Higher education processes are being harmonised across the European Community. Nowadays the university offers 101 different "Laurea" or "Laurea breve" first-level degrees (three years of courses), followed by 108 "Laurea specialistica" or "Laurea magistrale" second-level degrees (two years). However, 11 other courses have maintained preceding rules of "Laurea specialistica a ciclo unico" or "Laurea magistrale a ciclo unico", with only one cycle of study of five years, except for medicine and dentistry which requires six years of courses. After the "Laurea" one may attain first level Master (one-year diploma, similar to a Postgraduate diploma). After second-level degrees are attained, one may proceed to second level Master, specialisation schools (residency), or doctorates of research (PhD).

The 11 Schools (which replace the preexisting 23 faculties) are:
 School of Agriculture and Veterinary Medicine
 School of Economics, Management and Statistics
 School of Engineering and Architecture
 School of Foreign Languages and Literature, Interpretation and Translation
 School of Law
 School of Arts, Humanities, and Cultural Heritage
 School of Medicine and Surgery
 School of Pharmacy, Biotechnologies and Sport Sciences
 School of Political Sciences
 School of Psychology and Education Sciences
 School of Sciences

The university is structured in 33 departments (there were 66 until 2012), organized by homogeneous research domains that integrate activities related to one or more faculty. A new department of Latin history was added in 2015.

The 33 departments are:
 Architecture - DA
 Cultural Heritage - DBC
 Chemistry "Giacomo Ciamician" - CHIM
 Industrial Chemistry "Toso Montanari" - CHIMIND
 Arts - DARvipem
 Pharmacy and Biotechnology - FaBiT
 Classical Philology and Italian Studies - FICLIT
 Philosophy and Communication Studies - FILCOM
 Physics and Astronomy - DIFA
 Computer Science and Engineering - DISI
 Civil, Chemical, Environmental, and Materials Engineering - DICAM
 Electrical, Electronic, and Information Engineering "Guglielmo Marconi" - DEI
 Industrial Engineering - DIN
 Interpreting and Translation - DIT
 Modern Languages, Literatures, and Cultures - LILEC
 Mathematics - MAT
 Experimental Medicine, Diagnostic Medicine and Specialty Medicine - DIMES
 Psychology - PSI
 Agricultural Sciences - DipSA
 Management - DiSA
 Biological, Geological, and Environmental Sciences - BiGeA
 Biomedical and Neuromotor Sciences - DIBINEM
 Education Studies "Giovanni Maria Bertin" - EDU
 Agricultural and Food Sciences - DISTAL
 Economics - DSE
 Legal Studies - DSG
 Medical and Surgical Sciences - DIMEC
 Veterinary Medical Sciences - DIMEVET
 Department for Life Quality Studies - QUVI
 Political and Social Sciences - SPS
 Statistical Sciences "Paolo Fortunati" - STAT
 Sociology and Business Law - SDE
 History and Cultures - DiSCi

Affiliates and other institutions

Il Mulino
In the early 1950s, some students of the University of Bologna were among the founders of the review "il Mulino". On 25 April 1951 the first issue of the review was published in Bologna. In a short time, "il Mulino" became one of the most interesting reference points in Italy for the political and cultural debate and established important editorial relationships in Italy and abroad. Editorial activities evolved along with the review. In 1954, the il Mulino publishing house (It. Società editrice il Mulino) was founded, which today represents one of the most relevant Italian publishers. In addition to this were initiated research projects (focusing mostly on the educational institutions and the political system in Italy), that eventually led, in 1964, to the establishment of the Istituto Carlo Cattaneo.

Collegio Superiore
The Collegio Superiore  is an excellence institution inside the University of Bologna, aimed at promoting students' merit through dedicated learning programmes.

The institution was founded in 1998 as Collegio d'Eccellenza. Together with the Institute for Advanced Study it is part of the Institute for Higher Study.

The Collegio Superiore offers an additional educational path to students enrolled in a degree programme at the University of Bologna, providing specialized courses as part of an interdisciplinary framework.

All students of the Collegio Superiore are granted a full-ride scholarship and additional benefits such as the assistance of a personal tutor and free accommodation at the Residence for Higher Study. In order to remain members of the Collegio Superiore students are required to maintain high marks in both their degree programme and the additional courses.

Beatrice Fraboni, professor of Physics of Matter, has been head of Collegio Superiore since 2019.

Notable people

Alumni
 Adone Zoli, former Prime Minister of Italy.
 Cardinal Alberto Bolognetti
 Pope Alexander VI
 Álvaro de Figueroa, former Prime Minister of Spain.
 Anna M. Borghi, Italian cognitive psychologist
 Augusto Righi, pioneer in the study of electromagnetism
 Carlo Goldoni, Italian playwright
 Carlo Rovelli, Italian theoretical physicist
 Carlo Severini
 Saint Charles Borromeo, archbishop of Milan
 Corrado Gini, Italian statistician, demographer and sociologist who developed the Gini coefficient/ratio.
 Dante Alighieri, Italian poet, writer and philosopher
 Daria de Pretis, Italian jurist, Constitutional Judge of the Constitutional Court of Italy.
 Diego Della Valle, chairman of the Italian leather goods company Tod's
 Enzo Ferrari, Italian racing driver, engineer and entrepreneur
 Erasmus of Rotterdam
 Fabrizio Zilibotti, Italian economist and Professor of International and Development Economics at Yale University.
 Fawziya Abikar Nur, Minister for Health and Social Care - Somalia.
 Gabriele Paleotti
 Gasparo Tagliacozzi, pioneer of plastic and reconstructive surgery
 Giacomo Matteotti
 Giovanni Pascoli
 Pope Gregory XIII (Ugo Boncompagni);
 Pope Gregory XV
 Gregorio Ricci-Curbastro, Italian mathematician and the inventor of tensor calculus.
 Guglielmo Marconi, Italian inventor and radio pioneer
 Henry of Susa (Hostiensis);
 Pope Innocent IX
 Irnerius, founder of the School of Glossators
 Joaquín Chapaprieta, former Prime Minister of Spain.
 Juan Fernando López Aguilar, former Minister of Justice - Spain.
 Julius Caesar Aranzi, the pioneer human anatomists and surgeons.
 Laura Bassi, the world's first woman to earn a university chair in a scientific field of studies
 Lazzaro Spallanzani, Italian priest, biologist and physiologist
 Leon Battista Alberti;
 Luigi Galvani;
 Manuel Olivencia, lawyer and academic;
 Mauro Moretti, former CEO and general manager of Leonardo S.p.A.
 Marcello Malpighi;
 Michelangelo Antonioni;
 Nicolaus Copernicus, formulator of the heliocentric universal model;
 Cardinal Paolo Burali d'Arezzo;
 Paracelsus, founder of the discipline of toxicology;
 Patrizio Bianchi, Minister of Public Education in the Draghi Cabinet
 Petrarch;
 Pico della Mirandola;
 Pier Luigi Nervi, Italian Structural engineer and architect of UNESCO Headquarters Paris (1950).
 Pier Paolo Pasolini;
 Pierluigi Collina, Chairman of the FIFA referees committee
 Piero Gnudi, Minister of Tourism and Sports in the Monti cabinet.
 Pietro Mengoli;
 Remo Gaspari, Minister of Relationships with the Parliament and Minister of Public Function in the Bettino Craxi and Giulio Andreotti Cabinet.
 Stefano Domenicali, CEO of Formula One Group, former CEO of Italian sports car manufacturer Automobili Lamborghini S.p.A. and Team Principal of Formula One team Scuderia Ferrari.
 Archbishop Thomas Becket;
 Tommaso Perelli, Italian astronomer
 Torquato Tasso;
 Ulisse Aldrovandi;
 Umberto Eco, Italian semiotician, philosopher and writer
 Mihalj Šilobod Bolšić (1724–1787), Roman Catholic priest, mathematician, writer, and musical theorist primarily known for writing the first Croatian arithmetic textbook Arithmatika Horvatzka (published in Zagreb, 1758)

Faculty and staff
Notable former faculty include:

 11th century
 Irnerius
 12th century
 Bulgarus
 Gratian
 Martinus Gosia
 Patriarch Heraclius of Jerusalem
 William of Tyre
 13th century
 Benvenutus Scotivoli
 Bettisia Gozzadini
 Guido Guinizelli
 Henry of Susa (Hostiensis)
 Paul, Dominican martyr
 Sylvester Gozzolini
 William of Saliceto
 14th century
 Manuel Chrysoloras
 Giovanni de' Marignolli
 Francesco Petrarca (also known as Petrarch)
 Coluccio Salutati
 15th century
 Leon Battista Alberti
 Nicolaus Copernicus
 Lippo Bartolomeo Dardi
 Yuriy Drohobych (also known as Georgius de Drohobycz)
 Giovanni Pico della Mirandola
 16th century
 Ulisse Aldrovandi
 Giovanni Antonio Magini
 Camillo Baldi
 Girolamo Cardano
 Ignazio Danti
 Giovanni Della Casa
 Girolamo Maggi
 Virgilio Malvezzi
 Paracelsus
 17th century
 Giovanni Cassini
 Niall Ó Glacáin
 Marcello Malpighi
 Pietro Mengoli
 18th century
 Laura Bassi
 Luigi Galvani
 Maria Gaetana Agnesi
 Carlo Goldoni
 19th century
 Augusto Righi
 Giacomo Ciamician
 Giosuè Carducci
 Giovanni Pascoli
 Pellegrino Rossi
 Francesco Selmi
 20th century
 Umberto Eco
 Beppo Levi
 Guglielmo Marconi
 Pier Paolo Pasolini
 Romano Prodi
 21st century
 Hamida Barmaki
 Özalp Babaoğlu
 Gabriella Campadelli-Fiume
 Pier Cesare Bori
 Augusto Barbera
 Gualtiero Calboli
 Ivano Dionigi
 Luciano Floridi

Rankings and reputation

The 2022 QS World University Rankings ranked the University of Bologna 166th in the world and 71st (first in Italy) with reference to academic reputation. In another measurement by the same company, it was positioned among the world's top 100 universities for graduate employability (84th).

In the 2021 Times Higher Education World University Rankings, it claimed the 167th place globally. In the THE Impact Rankings of the same year, measuring the universities' commitment to sustainable development in compliance with the UN 2030 Agenda, Bologna took first place in Europe and sixth in the world.

Nationally, in 2020 Bologna topped Italy's main ranking of large public universities (> 40,000 students) for the eleventh year in a row, produced by the Italian Center for Social Investment Studies.

Points of interest
 Orto Botanico dell'Università di Bologna

See also
 Bologna
 Bologna declaration
 Bologna process
 Coimbra Group (a network of leading European universities)
 Collegio Superiore di Bologna (school of excellence of the University of Bologna)
 List of Italian universities
 List of medieval universities
 Medieval university
 Palazzo Poggi
 Utrecht Network

References

External links

 University of Bologna Website 
  (also has a Chinese version)
 
 Scholars and Literati at the University of Bologna (1088–1800), in Repertorium Eruditorum Totius Europae/RETE

 
1088 establishments in Europe
11th-century establishments in Italy
Buildings and structures in Bologna
Education in Bologna
Bologna, University of
Medical schools in Italy